Xinqiao is a town of Zizhong County in southeastern Sichuan province, China, located  west-southwest of the county seat and about  northwest of downtown Neijiang. , it has one residential community (社区) and 25 villages under its administration.

References 

Township-level divisions of Sichuan